Pulsus may refer to:

Medical Conditions 

 Pulsus alternans, a physical finding with arterial pulse waveform
 Pulsus bigeminus, groups of two heartbeats close together followed by a longer pause
 Pulsus bisferiens, a medical condition which an aortic waveform with two peaks per cardiac cycle
 Pulsus paradoxus, a medical condition of an abnormally large decrease in stroke volume, systolic blood pressure and pulse wave amplitude during inspiration

Other uses 

 Pulsus Group, a publisher of scientific, technical, and medical literature